Brian Bara Chari (born 14 February 1992) is a Zimbabwean cricketer. He made his international debut for the Zimbabwe national cricket team in November 2014.

Domestic career
A top-order batsman and occasional off break bowler, Chari has played domestically for the Matabeleland Tuskers since 2011. He was the leading run-scorer for Matabeleland Tuskers in the 2017–18 Pro50 Championship tournament, with 316 runs in eight matches. He was also the leading run-scorer for the Matabeleland Tuskers in the 2018–19 Logan Cup, with 356 runs in six matches.

In December 2020, he was named as the captain of the Tuskers for the 2020–21 Logan Cup.

International career
Chari made his Test debut for Zimbabwe in November 2014, playing in two of the team's three Tests on their tour of Bangladesh. He made his One Day International (ODI) debut for Zimbabwe against Pakistan on 1 October 2015.

In June 2018, he was named in a 22-man preliminary Twenty20 International (T20I) squad for the 2018 Zimbabwe Tri-Nation Series. The following month, he was named in Zimbabwe's One Day International (ODI) squad for their series against Pakistan.

In September 2018, he was named in Zimbabwe's squad for the 2018 Africa T20 Cup tournament. In September 2019, he was named in Zimbabwe's Twenty20 International (T20I) squad for the 2019–20 Singapore Tri-Nation Series. He made his T20I debut for Zimbabwe, against Nepal, in the Singapore Tri-Nation Series on 27 September 2019.

References

External links
 

1992 births
Living people
Zimbabwean cricketers
Zimbabwe Test cricketers
Zimbabwe One Day International cricketers
Zimbabwe Twenty20 International cricketers
Matabeleland Tuskers cricketers